Gimel may mean
Gimel, Switzerland, a municipality in the canton of Vaud
Gimel-les-Cascades, France
Gimel (letter), a Hebrew letter
Yom Gimel, or simply Gimel, a day of sick leave in the Israel Defense Forces
Plan Gimel (Plan C), a general military plan worked out by the Zionist paramilitary organization Haganah in 1946, before Plan Dalet
Gymel, technique of temporarily dividing up one voice part, usually an upper one, into two parts of equal range, but singing different music
Gimel is The High Priestess who is one of the 22 trump cards (Major Arcana) in tarot
Gimel function in set theory